The European Centre for International Political Economy (ECIPE) is an independent and non-profit policy research think tank dedicated to trade policy and other international economic policy issues of importance to Europe. It is based in Brussels and was founded in 2006 by the economists Fredrik Erixon and Razeen Sally.

Work 
Its research programme features research projects on the World Trade Organization, EU-Asia commercial relations, trade in health care, trade and development and several other topical themes with a political economy flavour.

ECIPE has publications in various series of working papers, policy briefs and books. The think tank organises conferences and seminars in Brussels and European capitals. It is a network-based organization with 10-15 affiliated scholars, many of them active advisors to various governments and international organisations. It also publishes a blog, Trade Matters.

Members 
Its secretariat, which is located in Brussels, has residential and visiting scholars. Its advisory board, chaired by Professor Patrick Messerlin. More than 40 academics, ministers, business leaders, former and current senior officials of international organisations are found amongst its advisory board and fellows.

References

External links
 ECIPE website
 ECIPE Trade Matters blog
 ECIPE publications

2006 establishments in Belgium
European integration think tanks
Think tanks established in 2006
Think tanks based in Belgium
Political and economic think tanks based in the European Union